The Chesterfield County Mathematics and Science High School at Clover Hill  is a magnet school in Midlothian, Virginia.  The school, which is on the campus of Clover Hill High School, opened in September 1994.  The school is a member of the National Consortium for Specialized Secondary Schools of Mathematics, Science, and Technology (NCSSSMST).  It was known as the Renaissance Program early in its history.

References

External links
School Website

Public high schools in Virginia
Educational institutions established in 1994
Schools in Chesterfield County, Virginia
Magnet schools in Virginia
1994 establishments in Virginia